Narayan Govind Kalelkar (Devanagari: नारायण गोविंद कालेलकर) (December 11, 1909 - 1989) was a  linguist from Maharashtra, India.

He was born in the village of Bambuli in Ratnagiri District. He received his early college education in Baroda and Mumbai with specialization in French language, and a D.Lit. Degree from a university in Paris.

He taught French and Literature at Baroda Vidyapeeth, and Indo-Aryan/Indo-European languages at Deccan College in Pune.

Kalelkar authored several books on linguistics in Marathi, they being the first of their kind in Marathi. His Dhwanivichar (ध्वनिविचार) (1955) and Bhasha Ani Samskruti (भाषा आणि संस्कृति) (1960) received Maharashtra state's literary prizes; and his  Bhasha: Itihas Ani Bhoogol (भाषा: इतिहास आणि भूगोल) (1964) received a Sahitya Akademi award in 1967.

Contribution to Konkani language
Kalekar's study of Konkani was instrumental in Sahitya Akademi's decision in 1975 to recognize Konkani as an independent Indian language (rather than being a dialect of Marathi).

20th-century Indian linguists
Kalelkar, Narayan Govind
1909 births
1989 deaths
Recipients of the Sahitya Akademi Award in Marathi